Carneades reticulata is a species of beetle in the family Cerambycidae. It was described by Bates in 1881. it is known from Colombia.

References

Colobotheini
Beetles described in 1881